Old Indiana County Jail and Sheriff's Office is a historic jail and Sheriff's office located in Indiana, Indiana County, Pennsylvania.  It consists of two buildings built in 1887–1888.  They are brick buildings in the Italianate-style.  The jail is attached to the rear of the Sheriff's Office, also known as the Sheriff's House.  They are connected to the Old Indiana County Courthouse by a second floor pedestrian bridge.

It was added to the National Register of Historic Places in 1979.

References

Indiana, Pennsylvania
Buildings and structures in Indiana County, Pennsylvania
Jails in Pennsylvania
Houses in Pennsylvania
Government buildings completed in 1888
Jails on the National Register of Historic Places in Pennsylvania
Houses on the National Register of Historic Places in Pennsylvania
National Register of Historic Places in Indiana County, Pennsylvania
Italianate architecture in Pennsylvania
Individually listed contributing properties to historic districts on the National Register in Pennsylvania